Oh Pioneer is the seventh studio album by Northern Irish recording artist Duke Special. It was released on 9 July 2012 by Duke Special's own record label Adventures in Gramophone.

Track listing

References

Duke Special albums